"As Simple as That" is a song co-written and recorded by American country music artist Mike Reid. It was released in July 1991 as the third single from his album Turning for Home.  The song reached number 14 on the Billboard Hot Country Singles & Tracks chart in October 1991.  Reid wrote the song with Allen Shamblin.

Chart performance

References

1991 singles
Mike Reid (singer) songs
Songs written by Mike Reid (singer)
Songs written by Allen Shamblin
Columbia Records singles
Song recordings produced by Steve Buckingham (record producer)
1991 songs